Marco Piochi (born 1 January 1957) is a retired Italian long jumper.

Biography
His personal best jump was 8.09 metres, achieved in June 1983 in Milan. He has 24 caps in national team from 1978 to 1985.

Achievements

National titles
He has won 1 times the individual national championship.
1 win in the long jump (1983)
1 win in the long jump indoor (1980)

See also
 Men's long jump Italian record progression

References

External links
 

1957 births
Living people
Italian male long jumpers
Athletes (track and field) at the 1983 Mediterranean Games
World Athletics Championships athletes for Italy
Mediterranean Games bronze medalists for Italy
Mediterranean Games medalists in athletics